The enzyme  malyl-CoA lyase catalyzes the chemical reaction

(3S)-3-carboxy-3-hydroxypropanoyl-CoA  acetyl-CoA + glyoxylate

This enzyme belongs to the family of lyases, specifically the oxo-acid-lyases, which cleave carbon-carbon bonds.  The systematic name of this enzyme class is (3S)-3-carboxy-3-hydroxypropanoyl-CoA glyoxylate-lyase (acetyl-CoA-forming). Other names in common use include malyl-coenzyme A lyase, and (3S)-3-carboxy-3-hydroxypropanoyl-CoA glyoxylate-lyase.  This enzyme participates in glyoxylate and dicarboxylate metabolism.

References

 

EC 4.1.3
Enzymes of unknown structure